Ahmed Mihoubi (2 June 1924 – 24 January 2004) was an Algerian-born French former international football defender.

References

External links
 
 

1924 births
2004 deaths
Algerian emigrants to France
Association football defenders
Algerian footballers
French footballers
France international footballers
FC Sète 34 players
Olympique Lyonnais players
Ligue 1 players
Ligue 2 players